Galičica is a mountain situated across the border between North Macedonia and Albania. There is a national park on North Macedonia's side of the mountain, situated between the two biggest lakes in the republic: Lake Ohrid and Lake Prespa.

Galičica is among the richest in endemic species among mountains in North Macedonia. The floral life in the Galičica National Park represents over 1600 species, of which many relicts and endems have the final frontier of its range exactly on the mountain Galičica. At the moment, it is intensively worked on the flora of the National Park and there are indications that the number of endems will be even bigger.

Views of the lakes and neighbouring mountains can be seen from the Galičica peaks. The second-highest peak is Magaro (2,255 m).

The National Park was confirmed by the government to be a national park in 1958.

Gallery

See also
 Mali i Thatë

External links

 National Park of Galicica

References

National parks of North Macedonia
Ohrid Municipality
Resen Municipality
Albania–North Macedonia border
International mountains of Europe
Two-thousanders of Albania
Two-thousanders of North Macedonia